Verin Vachagan (also, Verkhniy Vachagan) is a town in the Syunik Province of Armenia.

References 

Populated places in Syunik Province